Jean Benot (born 22 May 1898, date of death unknown) was a French racing cyclist. He rode in the 1922 Tour de France.

References

1898 births
Year of death missing
French male cyclists
Place of birth missing